The Akwesasne Warriors were a minor league professional ice hockey team in the Federal Hockey League from 2010-2012. Based at Akwesasne in the Mohawk Nation (Kanien'kehá:ka) Territory (near Cornwall, Ontario), the Warriors played at the A`nowara`ko:wa Arena.

NHL Alumni players
 Pierre Dagenais

External links
Akwesasne Warriors

Federal Prospects Hockey League teams
Ice hockey teams in Ontario
2010 establishments in Ontario
2012 disestablishments in Ontario
Ice hockey clubs established in 2010
Ice hockey clubs disestablished in 2012
Akwesasne